Darlington County is a county in the U.S. state of South Carolina. As of the 2020 census, its population was 62,905. Its county seat is Darlington. Hartsville is the largest city in the county. Darlington County is home to the Darlington Raceway, which hosts the annual NASCAR Southern 500. Darlington County is also home to Coker College in Hartsville. Darlington County was named by an act in March 1785.

Darlington County is included in the Florence, SC Metropolitan Statistical Area. The county's population was nearly 60% rural in 2000.

Geography

National protected area 
 Great Pee Dee River Heritage Preserve Wildlife Management Area (part)

State and local protected areas/sites 
 Great Pee Dee Heritage Preserve
 Kalmia Gardens

Major water bodies 
 Back Swamp
 Black Creek
 Cedar Creek
 Great Pee Dee River
 High Hill Creek
 Lake Robinson
 Lynches River
 Sparrow Swamp

Adjacent counties
 Florence County - southeast
 Marlboro County - northeast
 Chesterfield County - northwest
 Lee County - southwest
 Kershaw County - west

Major highways

Major infrastructure 
 Darlington County Jetport
 Hartsville Regional Airport

Demographics

2020 census

As of the 2020 United States Census, there were 62,905 people, 24,801 households, and 17,344 families residing in the county.

2010 census
As of the 2010 United States Census, there were 68,681 people, 26,531 households, and 18,552 families living in the county. The racial makeup of the county was 55.9% white, 41.6% black or African American, 0.3% Asian, 0.3% American Indian, 0.9% from other races, and 1.1% from two or more races. Those of Hispanic or Latino origin made up 1.7% of the population. In terms of ancestry, 9.5% were American, 7.0% were English, and 5.3% were Irish.

Of the 26,531 households, 34.1% had children under the age of 18 living with them, 44.0% were married couples living together, 20.5% had a female householder with no husband present, 30.1% were non-families, and 26.0% of all households were made up of individuals. The average household size was 2.54 and the average family size was 3.04. The median age was 39.6 years.

The median income for a household in the county was $38,379 and the median income for a family was $46,894. Males had a median income of $40,089 versus $29,255 for females. The per capita income for the county was $20,096. About 14.6% of families and 20.0% of the population were below the poverty line, including 30.7% of those under age 18 and 15.1% of those age 65 or over.

2000 census
As of the census of 2000, there were 67,394 people, 25,793 households, and 18,441 families living in the county. The racial makeup of the county was 56.98% White, 41.70% Black or African American, 0.19% Native American, 0.21% Asian, 0.01% Pacific Islander, 0.39% from other races, and 0.52% from two or more races.  0.98% of the population were Hispanic or Latino of any race.

There were 25,793 households, out of which 32.20% had children under the age of 18 living with them, 48.30% were married couples living together, 18.70% had a female householder with no husband present, and 28.50% were non-families. 25.10% of all households were made up of individuals, and 9.20% had someone living alone who was 65 years of age or older.  The average household size was 2.57 and the average family size was 3.07.

In the county, the population was spread out, with 26.30% under the age of 18, 9.00% from 18 to 24, 28.20% from 25 to 44, 24.40% from 45 to 64, and 12.10% who were 65 years of age or older.  The median age was 36 years. For every 100 females, there were 89.80 males.  For every 100 females age 18 and over, there were 84.60 males.

The median income for a household in the county was $31,087, and the median income for a family was $37,662. Males had a median income of $30,947 versus $20,998 for females. The per capita income for the county was $16,283.  About 16.40% of families and 20.30% of the population were below the poverty line, including 26.70% of those under age 18 and 22.10% of those age 65 or over.

As of Census 2000, Darlington County was classified as 41% urban and 59% rural. It contains the two urbanized areas of Hartsville (2000 pop. 14,907) and Darlington (12,066). The county's population is included within the Florence Metropolitan Statistical Area.

Government and politics

Communities

Cities
 Darlington (county seat)
 Hartsville (largest city)

Towns
 Lamar
 Society Hill

Census-designated places
 Dovesville
 Lydia
 North Hartsville
 Pine Ridge

Other unincorporated communities
 Clyde
 Mont Clare
 Una

Notable people
 Harry G. Byrd, Major League Baseball right-handed starting pitcher who played for the Philadelphia Athletics, New York Yankees, Baltimore Orioles, Chicago White Sox, and Detroit Tigers. He was born in Darlington. SC 151 in Darlington is named Harry Byrd Highway in his honor.
 William G. Farrow, lieutenant in the United States Army Air Corps who participated in the Doolittle Raid; born in Darlington in 1918
 Albert Haynesworth, a professional football player who played primarily for the Tennessee Titans and Washington Redskins; born in Hartsville
 W. W. Hicks, member of the Louisiana House of Representatives for Webster Parish, 1900 to 1904; born in Darlington County in 1843
 Orlando Hudson, former Major League baseball player; born in Darlington
 Jordan Lyles, Major League baseball player; born in Hartsville.
 Bobo Newsom, Major League Baseball pitcher with the Tigers, Senators, Cubs, Dodgers, Yankees, Giants, and Red Sox. He compiled a 211–222 record over 20 seasons, including a 21–5 season in 1940. SC 151 in Hartsville is named Bobo Newsom Highway in his honor.
 James E. Williams, sailor of the United States Navy during the 1950s and 1960s. He was the most highly decorated enlisted man in the history of the United States Navy and a recipient of the Congressional Medal of Honor.

See also
 List of counties in South Carolina
 National Register of Historic Places listings in Darlington County, South Carolina
 Wildlife management area

References

Further reading

External links

 
 
 Darlington County School District
  Old Darlington District Chapter, SC Genealogical Society
 Darlington County History and Images

 
1785 establishments in South Carolina
Populated places established in 1785
Florence, South Carolina metropolitan area